Andrew Boden (died December 20, 1835) was a member of the U.S. House of Representatives from Pennsylvania.

Andrew Boden was born in Carlisle, Pennsylvania.  He studied law, was admitted to the bar and practiced and was also engaged in the real estate business.

Boden was elected as a Republican to the Fifteenth Congress and reelected to the Sixteenth Congress.  He resumed the practice of law and died in Carlisle in 1835.

Sources

The Political Graveyard

18th-century births
1835 deaths
Pennsylvania lawyers
People from Carlisle, Pennsylvania
Democratic-Republican Party members of the United States House of Representatives from Pennsylvania
19th-century American lawyers